Leslie Frank Cupples  (8 February 1898 – 10 August 1972) was a New Zealand rugby union player. A loose forward, Cupples represented  at a provincial level, and was a member of the New Zealand national side, the All Blacks, from 1922 to 1925. He played 29 matches for the All Blacks including two internationals, scoring six tries in all.

Cupples was almost certainly the only member of the Exclusive Brethren sect to play for the All Blacks.

During World War I, Cupples served with the New Zealand Medical Corps in Egypt and on the Western Front, rising to the rank of corporal. He was attached to the No. 2 Field Ambulance, and in 1917 was awarded the Military Medal.

Cupples farmed on Cambridge Rd near Hanlin Rd. He was particularly  proud of his belted Galloway cattle.

Cupples died in Hamilton on 10 August 1972, and was buried at Hautapu Cemetery, Cambridge.

References

1898 births
1972 deaths
People from Otautau
New Zealand rugby union players
New Zealand international rugby union players
Bay of Plenty rugby union players
Rugby union flankers
New Zealand military personnel of World War I
New Zealand recipients of the Military Medal
Burials at Hautapu Cemetery
Rugby union players from Southland, New Zealand